The mixed team BC1–2 boccia event at the 2012 Summer Paralympics was contested from 2 to 4 September at ExCeL London.

Team rosters

Group stage

Group A

Group B

Group C

Group D

Knockout stage

References 

 

Team BC1-2